Tung Wan (東灣, lit. "East Bay") is the name of several bays in Hong Kong:
 Peng Chau
 Double Island (Wong Wan Chau)
 Ma Wan
 Cheung Chau
 Shek Pik, Lantau Island
 Tai A Chau, Soko Islands
 Tai Long Wan, Sai Kung Peninsula

See also
 Tung Wan Beach (disambiguation)

zh:東灣